Ameivula cipoensis is a species of teiid lizard endemic to Brazil.

References

cipoensis
Reptiles described in 2014
Lizards of South America
Reptiles of Brazil
Taxa named by Federico José Arias
Taxa named by Celso Morato de Carvalho
Taxa named by Hussam Zaher
Taxa named by Miguel Trefaut Rodrigues